Irati Idirin Egaña (born 13 May 1994) is a Spanish professional racing cyclist, who currently rides for Spanish amateur team Murias–Limousin.

See also
 List of 2016 UCI Women's Teams and riders

References

External links
 

1994 births
Living people
Spanish female cyclists
People from Arratia-Nerbioi
Cyclists from the Basque Country (autonomous community)
Sportspeople from Biscay